Virginia Lago (born 22 May 1946) is an Argentine actress with an extensive career in theater, film, and television. She is best known for being the host of the popular film series , broadcast by Telefe.

Biography
Virginia Lago was born in San Martín in the north of Greater Buenos Aires on 22 May 1946. Until age 20 she resided in Villa Ballester. She attended primary school at Roberto Noble School No. 11, and Tomás Guido secondary school in San Martín. She is the cousin of actress Zully Moreno and the aunt of actress Fabiana García Lago.

In 1963 she had a prominent performance in the play Pygmalion.

Internet meme
As a result of the series that Virginia Lago hosted on Telefe, around March 2012, her image became the subject of an Internet meme in which her way of speaking and acting is parodied. Videos in which she is imitated have circulated on YouTube, Facebook, and Twitter. In the parodies, emphasis is placed on Lago's unhurried tone, the diminutives and temperance in her speech, and her recurring catchphrase ¡maravilloso! (wonderful) to describe a situation. Lago acknowledged that she initially cried about these jokes, but then took them with humor.

Career

Television

Awards and nominations

Martín Fierro Awards
 1990: Winner of Best Supporting Actress for La bonita página
 1991: Nominated for Best Supporting Actress for 
 2006: Nominated for Best Supporting Actress in Drama for Montecristo
 2008: Winner of Best Supporting Actress in Drama for Mujeres de nadie
 2011: Nominated for Best Leading Actress in Special or Miniseries for 
 2013: Winner of Best Female Host for

Other awards
 1984: Sea Star Award for Best Actress
 1984: Prensario Award for Best Actress

 1991: Diploma of Merit, Individual Category, from the Konex Foundation
 1999:  from the Argentine Actors Association
 2009: José María Vilches Award for Por el placer de volver a verla
 2012: Sea Star Award for 
 2013:  Career Award

References

External links

 

1946 births
20th-century Argentine actresses
21st-century Argentine actresses
Argentine film actresses
Argentine stage actresses
Argentine telenovela actresses
Argentine theatre directors
Internet memes introduced in 2012
Living people
People from San Martín, Buenos Aires
Argentine women television presenters
Women theatre directors